Stevan Sretenović (born 25 September 1995) is a Serbian handball player for Balatonfüredi KSE and the Serbian national team.

Career
After playing for Partizan, Sretenović moved abroad to France and signed with USAM Nîmes Gard in August 2016.

A Serbia international since 2014, Sretenović participated in the 2020 European Men's Handball Championship.

He represented Serbia at the 2020 European Men's Handball Championship.

References

External links

1995 births
Living people
People from Aranđelovac
Serbian male handball players
RK Partizan players
RK Vojvodina players
Expatriate handball players
Serbian expatriate sportspeople in France
Competitors at the 2018 Mediterranean Games
Mediterranean Games competitors for Serbia
21st-century Serbian people